Pazardzhik Province ( Oblast Pazardzhik, former name Pazardzhik okrug) is a province in Southern Bulgaria, named after its administrative and industrial centre - the city of Pazardzhik. The territory is  that is divided into 12 municipalities with a total population of 275,548 inhabitants, as of February 2011.

History

The territory of the Pazardzhik Province has been inhabited since very early times. There are more than 50 discovered Stone Age and Bronze Age settlements. The earliest civilization to inhabit the region were the Thracians. The remains of the Thracian town Besapara are located in the hills near the provincial capital Pazardzhik. The Panagyurishte Treasure unearthed near the northern town of the same name is known as one of the finest examples of Thracian art. The 6.164 kg of 23-karat gold treasure which consists of nine vessels has been dated back to the 4th and 3rd century BC. In the 1st century BC the region became a Roman province and remained in the Byzantine Empire after the fall of Rome.

Most of the region became part of the Bulgarian Empire in the beginning of the 9th century and remained in Bulgarian hands until the fall of the First Empire. With the rise of the Second Bulgarian Empire the region once again became part of the country until it was overran by the Ottomans in the late 14th century. Some of medieval fortresses are Tsepina near the village of Dorkovo and Krasen in the vicinities of Bata.

The April Uprising of 1876 against the Ottoman rule was widely supported within the region and the town of Panagyurishte became the center of the uprising. The Bulgarian population also rebelled to the south where the Ottoman atrocities culminated in the Batak massacre. The massacre included 8,000 people killed and one of the deadliest massacres in Bulgarian history. According to the Treaty of Berlin after the Liberation of Bulgaria in 1878 the region was included in the autonomous region Eastern Rumelia. It included the okolias Pazardzhik, Peshtera, Ihtiman, Koprivshtitsa and Panagyurishte. The department was later incooporated into the new Principality of Bulgaria on 6 September 1885.

The first reported Red Army troops in the region were in Pazardzhik on 23 September 1944, where the Soviet command was headed by Dimitry Gorunkov. Territorial changes were made, as Sarnitsa was transferred from Devinska okolia to Pazardzhik okolia in 1949. A concentration camp was established with the name Camp ''C''. Demonstrations were held in 1989 with more than 5,000 people alone in the administrative capital.

Sarnitsa Municipality became the newest municipality in the province, as well as in Bulgaria on 1 January 2015.

Geography 

The Pazardzhik Province is situated in central part of southern Bulgaria and borders the provinces of Plovdiv, Smolyan, Blagoevgrad and Sofia. The total area of the region is 4,458 km2 which is 4% of the national territory. Forests account for more than half of the area (57.1%); the arable land is 35.6%, urban territory is 3.3%, rivers and lakes occupy 2.6%, road infrastructure - 0.6% and quarries and mines - 0,4%.

The northern parts of the region include the middle ridges of the Sredna Gora mountain, to the south the relief flattens and forms the westernmost parts of the Upper Thracian Plain and to the south are located the Rhodope Mountains where most of the forests are situated. The highest point of the region is Savov Vrah at an altitude of 2,306 m while the lowest altitude is around 200 m in the plains of the central area. The climate is transcontinental with milder winter than northern Bulgaria in the lowlands but with very low temperatures and high snowfall in the mountain areas. The average annual temperature is 11.3 °C.

The province is abundant in water resources, its main waterway is the river Maritsa and its catchment basin includes the Topolnitsa River and Luda Yana River from the north and Stara Reka from the south. There are three main reservoirs all situated in the Rhodope Mountains within the municipal limits of Batak - Batak Reservoir, Golyam Beglik and Shiroka Polyana. A fourth large dam lake, the Dospat Reservoir is only partially in the region. In Sredna Gora to the north is Topolnitsa Reservoir shared with the Sofia Province and a dam near Panagyurishte which is in initial stages of construction.

Municipalities

The Pazardzik province (област, oblast) contains 12 municipalities ( - plural:). The following table shows the names of each municipality in English and Cyrillic, the main town or village (towns are shown in bold), and the population of each as of December 2009.

Demographics

Total population (2011 census): 275,548

The following table represents the change of the population in the province after World War II:

Ethnic groups

Total population (2011 census): 275,548
Ethnic groups (2011 census):
Identified themselves: 246,002 persons:
Bulgarians:  206,110 (83.78%)
Romani: 20,350 (8.27%)
Turks: 14,062 (5.72%)
Others and indefinable: 5,480 (2.23%)
A further 30,000 persons in Pazardzhik Province did not declare their ethnic group at the 2011 census.

Ethnic groups in the province according to 2001 census:
261,260 Bulgarians, 23,970 Romani,
20,448 Turks and 5,045 others and unspecified.

Languages

Mother tongues in the province according to 2001 census:
260,817 Bulgarian, 24,204 Romani,
21,902 Turkish and 3800 others and unspecified.

Religion 

Religious adherence in the province according to 2001 census:

Economy

The backbone of the economy in the region is industry. The "Batashki Vodnosilov Pat" is an important hydrocomplex consisting of three hydro power plants- "Batak", "Peshtera" and "Aleko" with combined capacity of around 250 MW. Copper extracting industry is of national and European importance with major mines located around Panagyurishte (Asarel and Medet), Elshitsa, Tsar Asen and Mina Radka. Machine building industry is developed in Pazardzhik (lead acid batteries), Panagyurishte (optical), Velingrad. There is flourishing pharmaceutical industry in Peshtera with more than 1 000 employees in the plant. Paper industry is developed in Belovo. Timber industry is very important in the southern part of the region (the Rhodopes)- Batak, Peshtera, Rakitovo and Velingrad. The manufacturing of textiles is well developed in Pazardzhik, Panagyurishte and Velingrad. There is a huge footwear plant in Peshtera. Food processing industry is developed in most of the towns.
Agriculture is also important, especially in the fertile central parts of the region. The most important crops are orchards (apples, plums and strawberries), grapes, wheat, barley, rye and rice.  Livestock breeding is relatively well developed in the mountainous areas.

Tourism

The province has considerable opportunities to develop mountain and rural tourism, especially in the southern parts where the Rhodope mountains are located. The slopes are covered with dense deciduous and higher up, coniferous forests, dotted with numerous artificial lakes. The largest one is the Batak Dam, on whose shores are built two resorts: Tsigov Chark and Saint Konstantin as well as many villas and shrines.  Fish is abundant in the dams, including carp, rudd, roach barbel, perch, zander and many others; the mountain streams are rich in trout.  There are spa resorts in Velingrad, Strelcha, Banya, Varvara.  The most famous landmarks are located in Panagyurishte, Pazardzhik, Batak, Velingrad.

Impressive ruins of an ancient basilica (the Belovo Basilica) rise in the hilly country, close to the town of Belovo. Numerous ruined fortresses are scattered around the province, the most famous of these are Tsepina, and the ramparts near Bata and Strelcha. The medieval Church of St Demetrius in the village of Patalenitsa has frescoes dating to the 12th–13th century.

Transportation and communications
The road network is not dense.  The Trakiya motorway runs through the middle of the region. The main railway between Sofia and Plovdiv also runs through it.  There are two other railways: to Panagyurishte and to Peshtera.  There are several military airports. 
As everywhere in Bulgaria, every town and village in the region is provided with electricity, drinking water and telephone network.  Each town and some villages are provided with Internet connection, and the cellular phone coverage is almost 100%, as most people own GSMs.
Some of the interconnecting roads, especially higher up the mountain, are currently in a very bad state following heavy downpours in 2005 and 2006.

See also
Provinces of Bulgaria
List of villages in Pazardzhik Province

Footnotes

External links
 Official site of the Pazardzhik Province

 
Provinces of Bulgaria